Nashpati Prime is a Pakistani digital media company based in Karachi. It serves video on demand content for entertainment purpose. The venture began operations in July 2018.

Background 
Nashpati Prime was initiated by QLinksGroup as part of their expansion towards a digital shift with clear focus of providing entertainment through video on demand. The group has been previously involved with Television Productions, Post Productions and Campaign Design for Producers, Film Makers and Broadcasters. It has showcasing various platforms including YouTube, Facebook, Instagram and its own website.

The venture also serves as content creator with distribution on partner platforms in form of alliances.

Content 
Nashpati Prime has programs outlay from wide spectrum of genres. Some of the projects include,

Saat Mulaqatein:

Drama web series directed by Kashif Nisar and starring Noman Ejaz along with Zara Tareen. Story revolves around a couple who fall out of love and have subsequent interactions during their course of separation.

Arpitah:

Horror web series starring Sarwat Gillani, Yasra Rizvi, Zain Afzal and Khalid Nizami and created by Qaiser Ali.

To be Honest:

Internet celebrity talk show hosted by standup comedian Tabish Hashmi with wide array of guests. The show has been directed and created by Azfar Ali.

Khanabadosh:

Public service program hosted and conducted by drama writer Zafar Mairaj, who covers an array of topics concerning value system, prejudice, human rights and life in general.

Recognition 
Nashpati Prime has been crediteds with initiating a 'Digital First' through its show To be Honest, initially streamed on its own platform and later on satellite television TV One.

Original programming

References

External links 
Official website
Nashpati Prime on YouTube

Video on demand services
Karachi
2018 establishments in Pakistan